Turricaspia is a genus of aquatic snails which includes marine snails, brackish water snails and freshwater snails which all have a gill and an operculum, aquatic gastropod mollusks in the family Hydrobiidae. Turricaspia is the type genus of the Turricaspiinae, which is a synonym of Pyrgulinae.

Species
Species within the genus Turricaspia include:
 Turricaspia andrussowi (B. Dybowski & Grochmalicki, 1915) - marine
 Turricaspia astrachanica (Pirogov, 1971) - freshwater
 Turricaspia bogatscheviana (Logvinenko & Starobogatov, 1968) - marine
 Turricaspia bogensis (Dubois in Küster, 1852) - brackish and marine
 Turricaspia boltovskoji (Golikov & Starobogatov, 1966) - brackish
 Turricaspia borceana (Golikov & Starobogatov, 1966) - marine
 Turricaspia caspia (Eichwald, 1838) - marine
 Turricaspia chersonica Alexenko & Starobogatov, 1987 - freshwater
 Turricaspia conus (Eichwald, 1838)
 Turricaspia conus conus (Eichwald, 1838) - marine
 Turricaspia conus lindholmiana (Golikov et Starobogatov, 1966) - marine and brackish
 Turricaspia crimeana (Golikov & Starobogatov, 1966) - marine
 Turricaspia dagestanica (Logvinenko & Starobogatov, 1968) - marine
 Turricaspia derbentina (Logvinenko & Starobogatov, 1968) - marine
 Turricaspia eburnea (Logvinenko & Starobogatov, 1968) - marine
 Turricaspia elegantula (Clessin & W. Dybowski in W. Dybowski, 1888) - marine
 Turricaspia iljinae (Golikov & Starobogatov, 1966) - marine
 Turricaspia ismailensis (Golikov & Starobogatov, 1966) - freshwater
 Turricaspia lirata (B. Dybowski & J. Grochmalicki, 1915)
 Turricaspia lirata marisnigri Starobogatov in Alexenko et Starobogatov, 1987 - marine
 Turricaspia martensii (Clessin & W. Dybowski in W. Dybowski, 1888) - freshwater and brackish
 Turricaspia meneghiniana (Issel, 1865) - marine
 Turricaspia nevesskae (Golikov & Starobogatov, 1966) - marine
 Turricaspia ovum Logvinenko & Starobogatov, 1968 - marine
 Turricaspia pullula (B. Dybowski & Grochmalicki, 1915) - marine
 Turricaspia sajenkovae (Logvinenko & Starobogatov, 1968) - marine and brackish
 Turricaspia spasskii (Logvinenko & Starobogatov, 1968) - marine
 Turricaspia spica (Eichwald, 1855) - marine and brackish
 Turricaspia triton (Eichwald, 1838) - marine and brackish
 Turricaspia trivialis (Logvinenko & Starobogatov, 1968) - marine
 Turricaspia turricula (Clessin et W. Dybowski in W. Dybowski, 1888) - type species, marine
 Turricaspia variabilis (Eichwald, 1838) - brackish and freshwater
 Turricaspia vinogradovi (Logvinenko & Starobogatov, 1968) - marine and brackish

References

Hydrobiidae